Perisyntrocha anialis is a moth in the family Crambidae. It is found in Indonesia (Borneo) and Papua New Guinea.

References

Spilomelinae
Moths described in 1859